Dubai National School, Al Barsha is an American School located in Barsha, Dubai, UAE. It is a private profit-making school. It has presently 2000 students enrolled.

References

External links 
 

Schools in Dubai